Arceuthobium vaginatum, called the "sheathed dwarf mistletoe" or "southwestern dwarf mistletoe" is a parasitic plant found in the southwestern United States and northwestern and central Mexico. It generally is found on pine (Pinus spp) trees.

Ethnobotany 
The Ramah Navaho have been documented as using a decoction of Arceuthobium vaginatum as a "ceremonial medicine".

References

vaginatum
Parasitic plants
Flora of the United States
Flora of Mexico
Taxa named by Aimé Bonpland
Taxa named by Alexander von Humboldt